The 1969 Washington Darts season was the second season of the team in the American Soccer League, and the club's third season in professional soccer.  This year, the team earned first place in the Southern Division and made it into the championship game known as the ASL Final.  They were this year's champions.  It would be the last year of the club in the ASL as it joined the North American Soccer league in the following year with a new team under the same name in 1970.

Background

Review

Competitions

ASL regular season

League standings

Results summaries

Results by round

Match reports

ASL Playoffs

Northern Division playoff

Championship final

Match reports

First leg

Second leg

Statistics

Transfers

References 

1969
Washington
Washington Darts